Paradejeania is a genus of flies in the family Tachinidae.

Species
P. rutilioides (Jaennicke, 1867)

References

Tachininae
Tachinidae genera
Taxa named by Friedrich Moritz Brauer
Taxa named by Julius von Bergenstamm